The 1661 Class was William Dean's second design of tank locomotive for England's Great Western Railway. Like the 1813 Class which preceded them, there were 40 1661s, turned out of Swindon Works in two batches.

Construction

Design
Unlike the 1813s, the 1661s had larger wheels, double frames with a longer wheelbase, and saddle, not side tanks. Their frames had originally been ordered for the tender engines of the 2361 Class; however, more 2361s turned out not to be needed, after tank engines (of Joseph Armstrong's 1076 Class) had been found to be successful hauling the heavy coal trains from Aberdare. Like the 2361s, the 1661s carried long boilers ( barrel) when new, but shorter boilers were fitted on overhaul. As usual with GWR saddle tanks, pannier tanks were later fitted to most of them, between 1910 and 1926.

Accident
In 1904, locomotive No. 1674 was one of two locomotives hauling an express passenger train that was derailed at Loughor, Glamorgan due to excessive speed. Surging of water in the saddle tanks of No. 1674 was considered a contributory factor. Five people were killed and eighteen were injured. Following the accident, eight of the class were sold to South Wales railways in 1906, duly returning into GWR stock at the Grouping in 1922.

In 1907 a second locomotive was involved in an accident.   Alexandra (Newport and South Wales) Docks and Railway No.28 (ex GWR 1683) was derailed by catch points at Bassaleg Junction, Monmouthshire, rolled down the embankment and landed in the local cricket field.  The locomotive was repaired and spent 15 years on the A(N&SW)D&R.

Withdrawal
The last in service was No. 1685, which ran until 1934. Along with the 1076 class, they were initially used on long distance mineral traffic in the Southern Division of the GWR. To quote le Fleming, "they were always rather misfits", but "...their distinctive features were welcomed by enthusiasts if not by the Running Dept."

References

1661
Steam locomotives of Great Britain
0-6-0ST locomotives
Railway locomotives introduced in 1886
Standard gauge steam locomotives of Great Britain
Scrapped locomotives
Passenger locomotives